Tim Sauter (born October 13, 1964) is an American race car driver. He has competed in the American Speed Association, the NASCAR Craftsman Truck Series, the Busch Series, and the Winston Cup Series. He is the son of Jim Sauter, and the brother of NASCAR drivers Jay and Johnny Sauter.

Racing career

Sauter made his NASCAR debut in 2000, at Memphis. Driving the No. 61 Stoops Freightliner car for Xpress Motorsports, he finished 29th. He ran an additional two races that season with a best finish of fifteenth at Homestead-Miami Speedway. He joined the team for a full-time run in 2001, and posted two top-ten finishes before the team suddenly closed up due to a lack of funding. He ended the season driving for the No. 19 AP Performance Racing team. He returned to the 19 team full-time in 2002 and posted seven top-ten finishes. He also ran a pair of Cup races for Dave Marcis, his best finish 34th at Dover International Speedway. A lack of sponsorship forced AP to close its doors at the end of season.

In 2003, he joined Mac Hill Motorsports for a part-time schedule of twelve races. His best finish came at New Hampshire International Speedway, where he finished seventeenth. He also drove in the Truck Series for three races, finishing fourteenth at Bristol Motor Speedway. He continued to drive part-time in 2004, driving the No. 56 Mac Hill car in four races. On August 4, 2005 the Gary SouthShore RailCats of the Northern League signed Sauter to a one-day contract. Though he struck out, he completed his baseball debut beating the Kansas City T-Bones.

In 2005, Lester Buildings became his sponsor and allowed him to run the No. 56 in twelve races. He was offered a full-time ride with McGill Motorsports in 2006, but he did not finish in the top-ten and mutually parted ways late in the season.

In 2007, he drove the No. 07 Green Light Racing truck full-time as a teammate to Chad McCumbee with Lester Buildings sponsoring. Sauter was also involved in a scary crash at Martinsville when his truck was hit several times after getting loose off turn 4. He was uninjured.

Sautner has not raced professionally since 2007.

Motorsports career results

NASCAR
(key) (Bold – Pole position awarded by qualifying time. Italics – Pole position earned by points standings or practice time. * – Most laps led.) Reynolds Tobacco Company, it was referred to as the NASCAR Winston Cup Series (1971–2003). A similar deal was made with Nextel in 2003, and it became the NASCAR Nextel Cup Series (2004–2007). Sprint acquired Nextel in 2005, and in 2008 the series was renamed the NASCAR Sprint Cup Series (2008–2016).

Winston Cup Series

Busch Series

Craftsman Truck Series

ARCA Bondo/Mar-Hyde Series
(key) (Bold – Pole position awarded by qualifying time. Italics – Pole position earned by points standings or practice time. * – Most laps led.)

References

External links
 
 

Living people
1964 births
People from Necedah, Wisconsin
Racing drivers from Wisconsin
NASCAR drivers
American Speed Association drivers
Gary SouthShore RailCats players
ARCA Midwest Tour drivers